Andreas Strand may refer to:
 Andreas Strand (gymnast)
 Andreas Strand (entomologist)
 Andreas Strand (footballer)